Melicope tahitensis is a species of plant in the family Rutaceae. It is endemic to French Polynesia.

References

tahitensis
Flora of French Polynesia
Tahiti
Near threatened flora of Oceania
Taxonomy articles created by Polbot
Plants described in 1873